The Fort Pitt Foundry was a nineteenth-century iron foundry in Pittsburgh, Pennsylvania.  It was originally established at Fifth Avenue and Smithfield Street in 1804 by Joseph McClurg, grandfather of Joseph W. McClurg, and his son Alex McClurg, father of bookseller and general Alexander C. McClurg. It was later moved to the area of Pittsburgh now known as the Strip District at 12th and Etna.  It was an early producer of ordnance for the United States, and manufactured cannonballs for Commodore Oliver Hazard Perry's forces in the War of 1812.  It was best known for the manufacture of large cannon.  One of the largest was a 20 inch bore Rodman Gun, a large black powder, smoothbore, muzzle-loading coastal defense gun.

The foundry was closed after the Civil War ended.  It was eventually sold to a rival in 1878.

References

Buildings and structures in Pittsburgh
Industrial buildings and structures in Pennsylvania
Manufacturing companies based in Pittsburgh
Manufacturing companies established in 1804
Ironworks and steel mills in Pennsylvania
American companies disestablished in 1878
Foundries in the United States
American companies established in 1804
1804 establishments in Pennsylvania
Manufacturing companies disestablished in 1878